Sirsaud (Devanagari: सिरसौद Sirsaud) is a village in Morar block of Gwalior district, in Madhya Pradesh, India. As of 2011, the village population is 3,009, in 523 households.

History 
At the beginning of the 20th century, Sirsaud was part of Gwalior State. Located in Pichhore pargana of zila Gird Gwalior, it had a population of 413. Its area was not listed because the village was unsurveyed. The village was held as a jagir.

References 

Villages in Gwalior district